The 2018 season was the Jacksonville Jaguars' 24th in the National Football League (NFL) and their second under head coach Doug Marrone. This was their first season in new uniforms, which were revealed in April 2018. The Jaguars had hopes of matching or improving on their 10–6 campaign from the year prior, but despite a 3–1 start, the Jags fell into a 7 game losing streak and failed to improve on their 10–6 record after a Week 10 loss to the Colts. After they lost to the Tennessee Titans in Week 14, the Jaguars fell to 4–9 and were officially eliminated from postseason contention. They finished 5–11, in last place in the AFC South.

Draft

Draft trades
The Jaguars traded a conditional sixth-round selection to Buffalo in exchange for defensive tackle Marcell Dareus. This pick became a fifth-round selection (166th overall) after Dareus remained on Jacksonville's roster for the remainder of the 2017 season and the Jaguars made the playoffs.
The Jaguars traded defensive end Chris Smith to the Bengals in exchange for a conditional selection. As Smith was on the Bengals' active roster for at least six games during the 2017 season, Jacksonville acquired Cincinnati's seventh-round selection (230th overall).

Staff

Final roster

Preseason
The Jaguars' preseason opponents and schedule were announced on April 11. Exact dates and times were finalized on April 19, when the regular season schedule was announced.

Regular season

Schedule
On January 11, 2018, the NFL announced that the Jaguars would play host to the Philadelphia Eagles at Wembley Stadium in London, England, as part of their commitment to the London Games. The game occurred during Week 8 (October 28), and was televised in the United States.

Note: Intra-division opponents are in bold text.

Game summaries

Week 1: at New York Giants

Week 2: vs. New England Patriots

Week 3: vs. Tennessee Titans

Week 4: vs. New York Jets

Week 5: at Kansas City Chiefs

Week 6: at Dallas Cowboys

Week 7: vs. Houston Texans

Week 8: vs. Philadelphia Eagles
NFL London Games

Week 10: at Indianapolis Colts

Week 11: vs. Pittsburgh Steelers

Week 12: at Buffalo Bills

Week 13: vs. Indianapolis Colts

Week 14: at Tennessee Titans

Week 15: vs. Washington Redskins

Week 16: at Miami Dolphins

Week 17: at Houston Texans

Standings

Division

Conference

References

External links
 

Jacksonville
Jacksonville Jaguars seasons
Jacksonville Jaguars